Pauri is a town in Uttarakhand, India.

Pauri may also refer to:
 Pauri language, a Bhil language of India
 Satu Pauri, Finnish athlete